Counsel for Crime is a 1937 American  crime film directed by John Brahm starring Otto Kruger, Douglass Montgomery and Jacqueline Wells.

Plot
Following his graduation from law school, Senator Robert Maddox's (Hall) adopted son Paul (Montgomery) is offered a job at Bill Mellon's (Kruger) law firm. Mellon, an unscrupulous criminal lawyer, is actually Paul's real father, but he keeps the fact a secret from him. When Paul discovers Mellon's corruption, he quits and lands a job as assistant district attorney.

Soon after taking the position, Paul spearheads a state investigation into legal malpractice. This worries Mellon and prompts him to assign a criminal to implicate those investigating him in a scandal. When the criminal learns about Paul's birth, he is accidentally shot by Mellon in an effort to conceal the information. Paul successfully prosecutes his own father, who is convicted of second-degree murder because he refuses to discuss the content of the papers over which he and Mitchell were struggling, thus protecting Paul and his mother.

Cast 
 Otto Kruger as Bill Mellon 
 Douglass Montgomery as Paul Maddox 
 Jacqueline Wells as Ann McIntyre 
 Thurston Hall as Senator Robert Maddox 
 Nana Bryant as Mrs. Maddox 
 Gene Morgan as Friday 
 Marc Lawrence as Edwin Mitchell 
 Robert Warwick as Asa Stewart 
 Stanley Fields as George Evans

References

External links
 
 
 

1937 films
1937 crime drama films
American crime drama films
American black-and-white films
Columbia Pictures films
1930s English-language films
Films directed by John Brahm
1930s American films